Goins is a surname. "Irish: variant of Going. Possibly an altered form of German Göing (see Going)" (Ancestry.com, 2013). It also comes from the French province of Bourbonnais.

Notable people with the surname include:

 Boris Goins (born 1967), American sprinter
 Edray Herber Goins (born 1972), African-American mathematician
 Glenn Goins (1954–1978), American singer-songwriter and musician
 Herbie Goins (born 1939), American singer
 Jesse D. Goins, American actor
 Michele Goins, American businesswoman
 Ray Goins (1936–2007), American bluegrass banjoist
 Ryan Goins (born 1988), American professional baseball player

References